In enzymology, an arginine deiminase is an enzyme that catalyzes the chemical reaction

L-arginine + H2O  L-citrulline + NH3

Thus, the two substrates of this enzyme are L-arginine and H2O, whereas its two products are L-citrulline and NH3.

This enzyme belongs to the family of hydrolases, those acting on carbon-nitrogen bonds other than peptide bonds, specifically in linear amidines.  The systematic name of this enzyme class is L-arginine iminohydrolase. Other names in common use include arginine dihydrolase, citrulline iminase, and L-arginine deiminase.  This enzyme participates in arginine and proline metabolism.  This enzyme is widely expressed in bacteria, including streptococcus and actinomyces. The bacterial arginine deiminase expression could be regulated by various environmental factors.

Recently, a new enzyme that catalyzes the chemical reaction

L-arginine + 2H2O  L-ornithine + 2NH3 + CO2 was identified in cyanobacteria which should be named as arginine dihydrolase.

Structural studies

References

 
 
 
 
 

EC 3.5.3
Enzymes of known structure